Descurainia pinnata is a species of flowering plant in the family Brassicaceae known by the common name western tansymustard. It is native to North America, where it is widespread and found in varied habitats. It is especially successful in deserts. It is a hardy plant which easily becomes weedy, and can spring up in disturbed, barren sites with bad soil. This is a hairy, heavily branched, mustardlike annual which is quite variable in appearance. There are several subspecies which vary from each other and individuals within a subspecies may look different depending on the climate they endure. This may be a clumping thicket or a tall, erect mustard. It generally does not exceed 70 centimeters in height. It has highly lobed or divided leaves with pointed, toothed lobes or leaflets. At the tips of the stem branches are tiny yellow flowers. The fruit is a silique one half to two centimeters long upon a threadlike pedicel. This plant reproduces only from seed. This tansymustard is toxic to grazing animals in large quantities due to nitrates and thiocyanates; however, it is nutritious in smaller amounts. The flowers are attractive to butterflies. The seeds are said to taste somewhat like black mustard and were utilized as food by Native American peoples such as the Navajo.

References

External links
Jepson Manual Treatment
USDA Plants Profile
Ecology
Photo gallery

pinnata
Plants used in Native American cuisine
Plants used in traditional Native American medicine